The 1987 PGA Championship was the 69th PGA Championship, held August 6–9 at the Champion Course of PGA National Golf Club in Palm Beach Gardens, Florida. In hot and windy conditions, Larry Nelson won his second PGA Championship in a sudden-death playoff over 1977 champion Lanny Wadkins. It was Nelson's third and final major title.

D.A. Weibring, a 54-hole co-leader, shot 76 (+4) and finished a stroke back at even-par 288. The other co-leader, Mark McCumber, posted 77 and finished in a tie for fifth. Two major champions in contention shot high scores and fell back: Seve Ballesteros (78) and Raymond Floyd (80).

In the August heat of Florida, the attendance was low. It was the second major played in Florida, following the PGA Championship in 1971, played in February at the old PGA National. Through 2021, this is the last major played in the state. The purse was the last under $1 million at the PGA Championship.

With the win, Nelson gained an automatic bid to the Ryder Cup team in 1987, his third, bumping Don Pooley. Nelson's record in that competition in late September was 0–3–1, as the U.S. lost the Cup for the first time on home soil. He lost all three pairs matches and halved his singles match.

The Champion Course hosted the Ryder Cup in 1983 and the Senior PGA Championship for 19 years (1982–2000). Since 2007, it has been the venue of The Honda Classic on the PGA Tour, played in March.

Round summaries

First round
Thursday, August 6, 1987
Source:

Second round
Saturday, August 7, 1987
Source:

Third round
Saturday, August 8, 1987

Source:

Final round
Sunday, August 9, 1987

Source:

Scorecard

Final round

Cumulative tournament scores, relative to par
Source:

Playoff
The sudden-death playoff began on the par-4 10th hole, where both missed the green. Nelson chipped to six feet (1.8 m) and Wadkins to four. First to putt, Nelson saved par but Wadkins missed his attempt to extend the playoff.

References

External links
PGA.com – 1987 PGA Championship

PGA Championship
Golf in Florida
PGA Championship
PGA Championship
PGA Championship
PGA Championship